Kålltorp is a district in Härlanda, Gothenburg, Sweden.

Gothenburg